HMS Vulture was one of three 6-gun, steam-powered  second-class paddle frigates built for the Royal Navy in the 1840s. She was initially deployed to the East Indies where she participated in actions against China and then played a minor role in the Crimean War of 1854–1855. The ship was sold for scrap in 1863.

Design and construction
The ship's tonnage was 1,190 tons burthen and she displaced . Her crew numbered 175–195 officers and ratings.

The ship was fitted with a pair of steam engines rated at 476 nominal horsepower, that had two vertical cylinders of  diameter with  stroke, that used steam provided by four boilers. Vulture carried six guns – two 8-inch guns of 95 cwt mounted on pivots at bow and stern, and four 8-inch guns of 65 cwt on broadside trucks.

She was launched on 21 September 1843 and was then fitted with Fairbairn engines in the East India Docks until 23 January 1844. She had cost £24,323 to build and £22,395 to fit out (including £21,429 for the 476 nhp engines). Vulture was first commissioned in February 1845 for the East Indies, and completed fitting for sea (for a further £9,173) at Sheerness Dockyard until 7 June 1845.

Career
She was involved in the Expedition to Canton of 1847. She paid off on return from the East Indies that same year, and then underwent a small repair at Sheerness and Woolwich in 1848–1849 (for £17,334). She was recommissioned in November 1852 and was used in the Baltic theatre of the Crimean War in 1854. She was in action with the Russians on 7 June 1854, in the action at Gamla Carleby, Finland. On 27 August 1855, she ran aground off Hanko Head, Grand Duchy of Finland whilst towing a vessel from Nargen to Farosund. She was severely damaged and was sent back to England for repairs. In February 1859, she ran aground on the Barbary Coast. She was recommissioned again in December 1859 for service in the Mediterranean. The ship was paid off on 5 April 1860, and laid up at Portsmouth. She was sold to Castle & Son, Charlton for scrap in October 1863.

Notes

Citations

Bibliography
 David Lyon and Rif Winfield, The Sail and Steam Navy List 1815–1889. Chatham Publishing, 2004. .

External links

 William Odgers VC and the Vulture 1854–1855

Ships built in Pembroke Dock
Crimean War naval ships of the United Kingdom
Frigates of the Royal Navy
Victorian-era frigates of the United Kingdom
1843 ships
Maritime incidents in August 1855
Maritime incidents in February 1859